Lake Crabtree is a  reservoir in Cary, North Carolina.  In order to alleviate the possibility of flooding, it was constructed in 1989 by the Natural Resources Conservation Service via damming the Crabtree Creek.  It is currently within the Lake Crabtree County Park and provides sailing and recreation opportunities to nearby residents.

References 

Crabtree
Protected areas of Wake County, North Carolina
Bodies of water of Wake County, North Carolina